The National Statistics Institute of Guatemala (INE) is the statistics agency of the Government of Guatemala.  It has responsibility to collect, prepare, and publish official statistics.  INE runs the population census and issues statistics on employment, price levels, poverty rates, and other standard national statistics.

INE will conduct a population census of Guatemala in July and August 2018, the twelfth such census.

INE publishes monthly consumer price index (CPI) statistics. Annual consumer price inflation was estimated at 4-5% in 2016.

INE publishes general agriculture, health, and environmental statistics.

References 

Government of Guatemala
Demographics of Guatemala
Economy of Guatemala
Government agencies established in 1985
1985 establishments in Guatemala